Camel racing is a popular sport in Western Asia, North Africa, the Horn of Africa, Pakistan, Mongolia and Australia. Professional camel racing, like horse racing, is an event for betting and tourist attraction. Camels can run at speeds up to 65 km/h (18 m/s; 40 mph) in short sprints and they can maintain a speed of 40 km/h (11 m/s; 25 mph) for an hour. Camels are often controlled by child jockeys, but allegations of human rights abuses have led to nationwide bans on underage labor in the UAE and Qatar. In modern camel racing, camels are often controlled by remote controlled robotic whips.

A major camel race is the Camel Cup held at Alice Springs which is the second biggest prize purse camel race in Australia. It is held annually and includes not only the camel races themselves, but also a collection of market stalls and other entertainment.

The biggest prize money camel race in Australia is "The Boulia Desert Sands" with a A$500,000 prize purse in Queensland.

History
Camel racing is a centuries-old racing event, which has been practiced as a traditional Middle Eastern sport since Medieval times. It can be at least traced back to the 7th century CE Arabian Peninsula where it was a folk sport practiced at social gatherings and festivals.

Child jockeys
Children are often favored as jockeys because of their light weight. It has been reported that thousands of children (some reported as young as 2 years old) are trafficked usually from countries such as Afghanistan, Bangladesh, Iran, Pakistan, and Sudan for use as jockeys in Arab States of the Persian Gulf. In 2005, aid workers estimated a range of 5,000 – 40,000 child camel jockeys in the Persian Gulf region.

Many child camel jockeys are seriously injured by falling off the camels. The child jockeys live in camps (called "ousbah") near the racetracks and many are victims of abuse. Hundreds of children have been rescued from camel farms in Oman, Qatar, and UAE and taken back to their original homes or kept in shelter homes. Many however, are unable to identify their parents or home communities in South Asia or Sudan. Some countries have issued penalties for those who trafficked child camel jockeys and ordered the owners responsibilities for returning the children back to their home countries. However, they report that in many instances the children rescued were those who had been sold away by their own parents in exchange for money or a job abroad. If they were returned, the children would again be sold for the same purposes. Other children did not speak their native languages, or did not know how to live outside the camel farms.

A prominent activist for rehabilitation and recovery of the jockeys is Pakistani lawyer Ansar Burney. He has focused a portion of his work on eliminating the use of child jockeys.

Banning
The United Arab Emirates was the first to ban the use of children under 15 as jockeys in camel racing when Sheikh Hamdan bin Zayed Al Nahyan announced the ban on 29 July 2002. In 2009 the UAE paid compensation to 879 former jockeys. While the UAE has said that it issues penalties for those found using children as jockeys, in 2010 volunteers from Anti-Slavery International photographed violations of the ban. Nowadays, the UAE is the birthplace of the current robot jockeys, which are designed to ride camels. The original design, a joint effort between the UAE and Switzerland. 

In Qatar, the former Emir of Qatar, Hamad Al Thani, banned child jockeys in 2005 and directed that, by 2007, all camel races would be directed by robotic jockeys.

See also
Desert racing
Camel wrestling
The Great Australian Camel Race, an Australian event held in 1988 to recognize the positive impact that camels had on the development of Australia

References

External links
 The Fascinating World of Camel Races: A Look into a Time-Honored Desert Tradition
 camelraces.net- Arabic
 Information and Resource Guide to Camel Racing
  Traditional Camel Racing in Oman article
  Racing in Rhythm in the UAE
  UAE Sports
  JSTOR
 Camel racing in Forbes NSW Australia - Pics & vid.

Animal racing
Camels
Child labour
Sport in the Arab world
Sport in Asia
Arab inventions